Rai News 24 is an Italian free-to-air television channel owned and operated by state-owned public broadcaster RAI – Radiotelevisione italiana. It is the company's all-news television channel, and is known for its 24-hour rolling news service and its live coverage of breaking news.

History

It was launched on 26th April 1999 at 6am. Until 19th May 2000, the channel broadcast live weekdays only and re-aired previous recordings during the weekend.
On 4th January 2017, the channel launched its own HD feed.
Since 25th March 2022, during the Russo-Ukrainian war crisis, the channel has started broadcasting the news in Ukrainian language, too.

Directors of Rai News 24
Roberto Morrione (from 1999 to 2006)
Corradino Mineo (from 2006 to 2013)	
Monica Maggioni (from 2013 to 2016) 	
Antonio di Bella (since 2016)

Journalists
Josephine Alessio 
Valentina Antonello
Serena Scorzoni  
Emanuela Bonchino
Renata Petillo
Carlotta Macerollo
Annalisa Fantilli
Marisa Adinolfi
Isabella Romano
Andrea Gerli
Iman Sabbah
Giancarlo Usai
Rino Pellino (RAI Correspondent for Berlin)
Emma Farnè
Daiana Paoli
Laura Tangherlini
Gianluca Semprini
Paolo Cappelli
Valentina Dello Russo
Roberto Vicaretti
Cristina Raschio
Giorgia Rombolá
Donato Bendicenti
Sabrina Bellomo
Stefano Masi
Antonio Monda
Paola Poggi
Marco Franzelli
Gerardo D'Amico
Andrea Bettini
Enrica Agostini
Alberto Melloni
Guido Zaccagnini
Laura Squillaci
Carlotta Macerollo
Loreta Cavaricci
Paola Marinozzi
Enrica Tommasini
Mario forenza
Donato Bendicenti
Alfrendo di Giovampaolo
Paoloa Cutini
Dario Marchetti
Costantino D' Orazio
Chiara Paduano

Logos

References

External links

 
On RaiPlay 

Free-to-air
News
Television channels and stations established in 1999
1999 establishments in Italy
Italian-language television stations
24-hour television news channels in Italy
Italian news websites